The Zuidwal volcano is an extinct volcano in the Netherlands at more than  below ground under the Wadden Sea, between Harlingen and Vlieland, just south west of the island Griend.

Discovery 
The volcano was discovered in 1970 when the French oil company Elf Aquitaine was doing test drills in the Wadden Sea, hoping to find a gas field that a seismic survey had indicated. To their surprise they hit volcanic rock beneath the reservoir rock, which turned out to be an extinct volcano. The gas field went in production in 1988 and is still producing gas. Another clue indicating the presence of the volcano was the temperature.

Volcano 

The volcano was formed about 160 million years ago, during a time of orogenesis on the European continent. The eruptions were short and severe with heavy explosions. This, along with the mineral composition, points to volcanic activity as a result of subduction far away from the volcano. During the Cimmerian Orogeny, the Cimmerian Plate collided with Kazakhstania, sending shock waves through the Eurasian Plate, resulting in volcanism.

The volcano is covered by layers of sandstone from the early Cretaceous that act as reservoir rock for the gas. The seal rock consists of shale.

The volcanic rock is magnetic, creating a magnetic anomaly.

See also
 Mulciber (volcano)

References

External links 
Vulkaan in Nederland – Wetenschap24.nl

Volcanoes of the Netherlands
Wadden Sea
Jurassic volcanoes
Extinct volcanoes
Magnetic anomalies
Stratovolcanoes